Christian G. Hartinger  (born 1974) is an Austrian-born New Zealand bioinorganic chemist known for his work in metal-based anticancer drugs. In 2022 he was elected a Fellow of the Royal Society Te Apārangi.

Scientific career
Hartinger studied chemistry at the University of Vienna, earning his MSc in 1999 and his PhD in 2001 under Bernhard Keppler. He was an Erwin Schrödinger Fellow with Paul Dyson at the École Polytechnique Fédérale de Lausanne from 2006 to 2008 and obtained his habilitation at the University of Vienna in 2009. In 2011, Hartinger was appointed the position of Associate Professor at Waipapa Taumata Rau, where he currently serves and in 2015 was promoted to professor.

Hartinger's research interests are in bioinorganic chemistry, medicinal chemistry, and bioanalytical chemistry, where he uses an interdisciplinary approach in drug discovery. He is specially interested in the development of metal-centred anticancer agents, particularly ruthenium anticancer drugs, and using analytical methods to characterise their behaviour in the presence of biomolecules.

Hartinger has now published over 169 publications and has an h-index of 69.

In 2022 Hartinger was elected a Fellow of the Royal Society Te Apārangi. The society said his "innovative approaches have established new directions in metallodrug research, and his developed methodologies continue to have far-reaching impact in the community. His findings challenge paradigms about the reactivity of metal compounds towards biomolecules and thereby inform the design of novel biomaterials".

Distinctions/honours

Selected research outputs

 Meier, S. M.; Novak, M. S.; Kandioller, W.; Jakupec, M. A.; Roller, A.; Keppler, B. K.; Hartinger, C. G., Aqueous chemistry and antiproliferative activity of a pyrone-based phosphoramidate Ru(arene) anticancer agent. Dalton Trans, 2014, 43 (26), 9851–9855
 Meier, S. M.; Babak, M. V.; Keppler, B. K.; Hartinger, C. G., Efficiently detecting metallodrug-protein adducts: ion trap versus time-of-flight mass analyzers. ChemMedChem, 2014, 9 (7), 1351–1355
 Hartinger, C. G.; Groessl, M.; Meier, S. M.; Casini, A.; Dyson, P. J., Application of mass spectrometric techniques to delineate the modes-of-action of anticancer metallodrugs. Chem Soc Rev, 2013, 42 (14), 6186–6199
 Meier, S. M.; Novak, M.; Kandioller, W.; Jakupec, M. A.; Arion, V. B.; Metzler-Nolte, N.; Keppler, B. K.; Hartinger, C. G., Identification of the structural determinants for anticancer activity of a ruthenium arene peptide conjugate. Chem Eur J, 2013, 19 (28), 9297–9307
 Kandioller, W.; Balsano, E.; Meier, S. M.; Jungwirth, U.; Göschl S.; Roller, A.; Jakupec, M. A.; Berger, W.; Keppler, B. K.; Hartinger, C. G., Organometallic anticancer complexes of lapachol: metal centre-dependent formation of reactive oxygen species and correlation with cytotoxicity. Chem Commun, 2013, 49 (32), 3348–3350
 Meier, S. M.; Hanif, M.; Pichler, V.; Novak, M.; Jirkovsky, E.; Jakupec, M. A.; Davey, C. A.; Keppler, B. K.; Hartinger, C. G., Novel metal(II) arene 2-pyridinecarbothioamides: A rationale to orally active organometallic anticancer agents. Chem Sci, 2013, 4 (4), 1837–1846
 Babak, M. V.; Meier, S. M.; Legin, A. A.; Adib Razavi, M. S.; Roller, A.; Jakupec, M. A.; Keppler, B. K.; Hartinger, C. G., Am(m)ines make the difference: organoruthenium am(m)ine complexes and their chemistry in anticancer drug development. Chemistry, 2013, 19 (13), 4308–4318
Kurzwernhart, A.; Kandioller, W.; Bächler S.; Bartel, C.; Martic, S.; Buczkowska, M.; Mühlgassner, G.; Jakupec, M. A.; Kraatz, H.; Berdnarski, P. J.; Arion, V. B.; Markos, D.; Keppler, B. K.; Hartinger, C. G., Structure-activity relationships of targeted RuII(η6-p-cymene) anticancer complexes with flavonol-derived ligands. J Med Chem, 2012, 55 (23), 10512-10522

References

External links

Hartinger group Webpage
University of Auckland staff profile
Articles on Google Scholar

21st-century chemists
Inorganic chemists
Analytical chemists
New Zealand chemists
Academic staff of the University of Auckland
University of Vienna alumni
1974 births
Living people
Scientists from Vienna
Fellows of the Royal Society of New Zealand